Héctor Antonio Rodríguez Ordeñana (June 13, 1920 – September 1, 2003) was a Major League Baseball third baseman for one season with the Chicago White Sox. His natural position was shortstop, but he had the misfortune to be with the White Sox while Chico Carrasquel played the position, followed by all-time great Luis Aparicio.
  
A native of Alquízar, Cuba, Rodríguez played in the Negro leagues with the New York Cubans, 1939 and 1944, and in the Mexican League, 1945–46 (Riley, 676) prior to the integration of organized baseball,

Before the 1951 season, Rodríguez was acquired by the Brooklyn Dodgers from the Tuneros de San Luis Potosí of the Mexican League. He was assigned to Brooklyn's farm club, the Montreal Royals, where he batted .302. On December 6 of that same year he was traded by the Dodgers to the Chicago White Sox for first baseman Rocky Nelson.

Rodríguez was Chicago's regular third baseman during the 1952 season.  He appeared in 124 games for the 81–73 White Sox and hit .265 with 1 home run and 40 runs batted in. He drew 47 walks and was hit by pitches 3 times, raising his on-base percentage to .346. He stole 7 bases, scored 55 runs, and struck out just 22 times in 407 at bats, making him the seventh-toughest to strike out in the American League. (once per every 18.5 at bats)

Defensively, his .959 fielding percentage was just above the league average for third basemen. Rodríguez went back to the minor leagues in 1953, and on October 8 of that year was traded to the Toronto Maple Leafs of the International League for pitcher Don Johnson.

While Rodríguez never again made it back to the big league level, he had an outstanding career with the Toronto Maple Leafs when they were the top-drawing team in the International League during the 1950s. He teamed with second baseman Mike Goliat to turn spectacular double plays. Rodríguez was so good at the position, the White Sox sent a film crew to Toronto to record his skill at turning double plays to be used in training their minor league shortstops. He was renowned for his underhand flip throws from deep in the hole between shortstop and third base, a throw not seen in Toronto until Tony Fernandez played shortstop for the American League Toronto Blue Jays in the 1990s.

Rodríguez died at the age of 83 in Cancún, Quintana Roo, Mexico.

References
Riley, James A. (2002). The Biographical Encyclopedia of the Negro Baseball Leagues. 2nd edition. New York: Carroll & Graf Publ. .

External links
 and Seamheads
Retrosheet

1920 births
2003 deaths
People from Artemisa Province
Alijadores de Tampico players
Azules de Veracruz players
Chicago White Sox players
Cuban expatriate baseball players in Canada
Diablos Rojos del México players
Major League Baseball third basemen
Major League Baseball players from Cuba
Cuban expatriate baseball players in the United States
Mexican League baseball players
Minor league baseball managers
Montreal Royals players
New York Cubans players
Piratas de Campeche players
Plataneros de Tabasco players
San Diego Padres (minor league) players
Syracuse Chiefs players
Toronto Maple Leafs (International League) players
Tuneros de San Luis Potosí players
Cuban expatriate baseball players in Mexico